Mikheyevo is the name of several  rural localities in Russia.

Arkhangelsk Oblast
As of 2022, one rural locality in Arkhangelsk Oblast bears this name:
Mikheyevo, Arkhangelsk Oblast, a village in Trufanogorsky Selsoviet of Pinezhsky District

Ivanovo Oblast
As of 2022, two rural localities in Ivanovo Oblast bear this name:
Mikheyevo, Komsomolsky District, Ivanovo Oblast, a village in Komsomolsky District
Mikheyevo, Yuzhsky District, Ivanovo Oblast, a village in Yuzhsky District

Kaluga Oblast
As of 2022, two rural localities in Kaluga Oblast bear this name:
Mikheyevo, Maloyaroslavetsky District, Kaluga Oblast, a village in Maloyaroslavetsky District
Mikheyevo, Medynsky District, Kaluga Oblast, a village in Medynsky District

Kirov Oblast
As of 2022, one rural locality in Kirov Oblast bears this name:
Mikheyevo, Kirov Oblast, a village in Fateyevsky Rural Okrug of Kirovo-Chepetsky District

Kostroma Oblast
As of 2022, four rural localities in Kostroma Oblast bear this name:
Mikheyevo, Antropovsky District, Kostroma Oblast, a village in Kurnovskoye Settlement of Antropovsky District
Mikheyevo, Buysky District, Kostroma Oblast, a village in Tsentralnoye Settlement of Buysky District
Mikheyevo, Kadyysky District, Kostroma Oblast, a village in Selishchenskoye Settlement of Kadyysky District
Mikheyevo, Nerekhtsky District, Kostroma Oblast, a village in Prigorodnoye Settlement of Nerekhtsky District

Moscow Oblast
As of 2022, four rural localities in Moscow Oblast bear this name:
Mikheyevo, Domodedovo, Moscow Oblast, a village under the administrative jurisdiction of the Domodedovo City Under Oblast Jurisdiction
Mikheyevo, Akatyevskoye Rural Settlement, Kolomensky District, Moscow Oblast, a village in Akatyevskoye Rural Settlement of Kolomensky District
Mikheyevo, Zarudenskoye Rural Settlement, Kolomensky District, Moscow Oblast, a village in Zarudenskoye Rural Settlement of Kolomensky District
Mikheyevo, Ramensky District, Moscow Oblast, a selo in Rybolovskoye Rural Settlement of Ramensky District

Novgorod Oblast
As of 2022, four rural localities in Novgorod Oblast bear this name:
Mikheyevo, Demyansky District, Novgorod Oblast, a village in Ilyinogorskoye Settlement of Demyansky District
Mikheyevo, Lyubytinsky District, Novgorod Oblast, a village under the administrative jurisdiction of  the urban-type settlement of  Nebolchi, Lyubytinsky District
Mikheyevo, Kalininskoye Settlement, Moshenskoy District, Novgorod Oblast, a village in Kalininskoye Settlement of Moshenskoy District
Mikheyevo, Kirovskoye Settlement, Moshenskoy District, Novgorod Oblast, a village in Kirovskoye Settlement of Moshenskoy District

Pskov Oblast
As of 2022, four rural localities in Pskov Oblast bear this name:
Mikheyevo (Zhadritskaya Rural Settlement), Novorzhevsky District, Pskov Oblast, a village in Novorzhevsky District; municipally, a part of Zhadritskaya Rural Settlement of that district
Mikheyevo (Veskinskaya Rural Settlement), Novorzhevsky District, Pskov Oblast, a village in Novorzhevsky District; municipally, a part of Veskinskaya Rural Settlement of that district
Mikheyevo, Pustoshkinsky District, Pskov Oblast, a village in Pustoshkinsky District
Mikheyevo, Sebezhsky District, Pskov Oblast, a village in Sebezhsky District

Smolensk Oblast
As of 2022, two rural localities in Smolensk Oblast bear this name:
Mikheyevo, Dukhovshchinsky District, Smolensk Oblast, a village in Prechistenskoye Rural Settlement of Dukhovshchinsky District
Mikheyevo, Kholm-Zhirkovsky District, Smolensk Oblast, a village in Pigulinskoye Rural Settlement of Kholm-Zhirkovsky District

Tver Oblast
As of 2022, seven rural localities in Tver Oblast bear this name:
Mikheyevo, Kalininsky District, Tver Oblast, a village in Kalininsky District
Mikheyevo, Kimrsky District, Tver Oblast, a village in Kimrsky District
Mikheyevo, Krasnokholmsky District, Tver Oblast, a village in Krasnokholmsky District
Mikheyevo, Likhoslavlsky District, Tver Oblast, a village in Likhoslavlsky District
Mikheyevo, Molokovsky District, Tver Oblast, a village in Molokovsky District
Mikheyevo, Sandovsky District, Tver Oblast, a village in Sandovsky District
Mikheyevo, Zapadnodvinsky District, Tver Oblast, a village in Zapadnodvinsky District

Vladimir Oblast
As of 2022, one rural locality in Vladimir Oblast bears this name:
Mikheyevo, Vladimir Oblast, a village in Sobinsky District

Vologda Oblast
As of 2022, three rural localities in Vologda Oblast bear this name:
Mikheyevo, Cherepovetsky District, Vologda Oblast, a village in Bolshedvorsky Selsoviet of Cherepovetsky District
Mikheyevo, Kichmengsko-Gorodetsky District, Vologda Oblast, a village in Kurilovsky Selsoviet of Kichmengsko-Gorodetsky District
Mikheyevo, Sokolsky District, Vologda Oblast, a village in Biryakovsky Selsoviet of Sokolsky District

Yaroslavl Oblast
As of 2022, eight rural localities in Yaroslavl Oblast bear this name:
Mikheyevo, Bolsheselsky District, Yaroslavl Oblast, a village in Chudinovsky Rural Okrug of Bolsheselsky District
Mikheyevo, Lyubimsky District, Yaroslavl Oblast, a village in Osetsky Rural Okrug of Lyubimsky District
Mikheyevo, Pereslavsky District, Yaroslavl Oblast, a village in Zagoryevsky Rural Okrug of Pereslavsky District
Mikheyevo, Poshekhonsky District, Yaroslavl Oblast, a village in Kolodinsky Rural Okrug of Poshekhonsky District
Mikheyevo, Rybinsky District, Yaroslavl Oblast, a village in Mikhaylovsky Rural Okrug of Rybinsky District
Mikheyevo, Tutayevsky District, Yaroslavl Oblast, a village in Pomogalovsky Rural Okrug of Tutayevsky District
Mikheyevo, Uglichsky District, Yaroslavl Oblast, a village in Pokrovsky Rural Okrug of Uglichsky District
Mikheyevo, Yaroslavsky District, Yaroslavl Oblast, a village in Mordvinovsky Rural Okrug of Yaroslavsky District